Jonny O'Mara and Ken Skupski were the defending champions but only O'Mara chose to defend his title, partnering Treat Huey. O'Mara lost in the first round to Antoine Hoang and Kyrian Jacquet.

Jonathan Eysseric and Quentin Halys won the title after defeating David Pel and Aisam-ul-Haq Qureshi 4–6, 7–6(7–5), [10–8] in the final.

Seeds

Draw

References

External links
 Main draw

Internationaux de Tennis de Vendée - Doubles
2021 Doubles